Ura-Juji-Jime is the fourth variation of the cross lock, Juji-Jime,
demonstrated in The Canon Of Judo,
the first three being Katate-,
Gyaku-, and Nami-
Juji-Jime.

See also 
 Judo technique

References 
 

Judo technique